NGC 6984 is a barred spiral galaxy located 180 million light years away in the constellation Indus.

It is known for having been the host of two recent supernovae: one in 2012 first known as SNhunt142 (later designated SN 2012im), and one in 2013 known as SN 2013ek. The first was a Type Ic and the second was a Type Ib/c. HST observations were initiated by Dr. Dan Milisavljevic.
NASA's press release about SN 2013ek said:

"It is so close to where SN 2012im was spotted that the two events are thought to be linked; the chance of two completely independent supernovae so close together and of the same class exploding within one year of one another is a very unlikely event. It was initially suggested that SN 2013ek may in fact be SN 2012im flaring up again, but further observations support the idea that they are separate supernovae — although they may be closely related in some as-yet-unknown way."

Gallery

References

External links
 

Barred spiral galaxies
Indus (constellation)
6984
65798